Aargau Verkehr AG (AVA) is a Swiss transportation company. It was formed on June 19, 2018, from the merger of BDWM Transport and the Wynental and Suhrental Railway. The new company operates both rail and bus services, with some of the latter being provided through its wholly owned subsidiary Limmat Bus AG. 

Whilst based in the canton of Aargau, the company also operates services in the cantons of Zürich and Lucerne.

History 
Aargau Verkehr formed on June 19, 2018, from the merger of BDWM Transport and the Wynental and Suhrental Railway. The meger led to the dissolving of the joint AAR bus+bahn brand that had previously united the Wynental and Suhrental Railway and the Busbetrieb Aarau.

Routes

Rail routes 
AVA owns and operates the following  gauge railway lines:

 the Menziken–Aarau–Schöftland line, formerly operated by the Wynental and Suhrental Railway. Services are operated as Aargau S-Bahn route .
 the Bremgarten–Dietikon line, formerly operated by BDWM Transport. Services are operated as Zürich S-Bahn route .

The company also has the contract to operate services between Zürich Altstetten and Killwangen on the Limmattal light rail line. This line is currently under construction, although one section, where AVA trains will eventually share tracks with Zürich tram route 2, has already opened for the tram service.

Bus routes 
AVA operates a number of bus routes under its own name:

 a network of 9 bus routes centred on Zofingen and Reiden
 route 340 from Wohlen to Meisterschwanden
 express route 444 from Bremgarten to Zürich
 express route 445 from Remetschwil to Zürich

The company also operates, through its wholly owned subsidiary Limmat Bus AG, a network of 10 bus routes between Zürich and Killwangen. These services are operated under contract to Verkehrsbetriebe Zürich (VBZ), and carry that organisation's brand rather than that of AVA.

References

External links 
 

Aargau Verkehr
Bus companies of Switzerland
Railway companies established in 2018
Railway companies of Switzerland
Swiss companies established in 2018
Transport in Aargau
Transport in the canton of Lucerne
Transport in the canton of Zürich